Marcus McKethan (born May 19, 1999) is an American football guard for the New York Giants of the National Football League (NFL). He played college football at North Carolina and was drafted by the Giants in the fifth round of the 2022 NFL Draft.

College career
McKethan was ranked as a threestar recruit by 247Sports.com coming out of high school. He committed to North Carolina on June 22, 2016 over an offer from NC State.

Professional career

McKethan was drafted by the New York Giants with the 173rd pick in the fifth round of the 2022 NFL Draft. On August 6, 2022, McKethan was placed on injured reserve with a torn ACL.

References

External links
 New York Giants bio
 North Carolina Tar Heels bio

Living people
American football offensive guards
North Carolina Tar Heels football players
People from Barnwell, South Carolina
Players of American football from South Carolina
1999 births
New York Giants players